Glen Tetley (February 3, 1926 – January 26, 2007) was an American ballet and modern dancer as well as a choreographer who mixed ballet and modern dance to create a new way of looking at dance, and is best known for his piece Pierrot Lunaire.

Biography
Glenford Andrew Tetley, Jr. was born on February 3, 1926, in Cleveland, Ohio.  While in medical school, Tetley found a passion for dance.  After graduating from Franklin and Marshall College in 1946, Tetley moved to New York City to study dance.

He began his career as a dancer, dancing in Hanya Holm's Broadway production of Kiss Me, Kate in 1948 and Juno in 1959, as well as with the New York City Opera Ballet, John Butler's American  Dance Theatre, and the Joffrey Ballet where he was an original member. Later he danced with American Ballet Theatre and Jerome Robbins's Ballets: USA. Tetley's choreographic style rises from his experiences with modern dance teachers like Holm and Martha Graham as well as his time with ballet teachers such as Antony Tudor and Margaret Craske. Because of this mix in dance education, Tetley's choreography is a distinct blend between ballet and modern dance. Tetley wanted to achieve a mix of "modern dance's visceral earthiness with the ethereal lyricism of classical ballet".
Mary Hinkson, a former dancer from the original Martha Graham company, has assisted Tetley all over the world. Her knowledge of the Graham technique helped shaping ballet dancers into Tetley's choreography.

Choreography
What made Tetley stand out among other choreographers was his ability to seamlessly mix ballet and modern dance.  Tetley choreographed over 50 ballets for some of the world's most famous dance companies. Tetley made his choreographic premier in 1962 with Pierrot Lunaire which he choreographed for his newly formed chamber company. Tetley based this piece on music of the same name by composer Arnold Schoenberg. Though this piece was one of his first choreographic ventures, it is heralded by many as one of his best and most iconic. It is also here where audiences first saw his iconic mix of ballet and modern dance. Other works choreographed by Tetley include: Contredances, Gemini, Odalisque, Ricercare, Le Sacre du Printemps, Sargasso, Sphinx, and Voluntaries. Tetley moved to Europe and became the Artistic Director for the Netherlands Dance Theatre in 1969 and the Stuttgart Ballet where he also danced from 1974–1976, before returning to North America to work with the National Ballet of Canada. While in Europe and Canada, Tetley choreographed many new pieces such as Alice in 1986 for the National Ballet of Canada.  At the time of his departure, many in the American dance community would either train in ballet or modern dance, but never both. Some believe that because of this rigidity and inability to accept the fusion of modern dance and ballet, Tetley moved to Europe where the atmosphere was more artistically free.

Style
Throughout his choreography Tetley displayed "fervid intensity, sinuous nonstop propulsion, and voluptuous physicality". While Tetley does not intentionally create abstract pieces, he uses his movement in order to "convey his meditations on themes from myth, music, theater, and literature".

Personal life
His long term partner of 40 years was Scott Douglas. On January 26, 2007, Tetley died in Florida, aged 80, following a battle with skin cancer. Dancers, such as Karen Kain, a member of the National Ballet of Canada, remember Tetley as a choreographer who had a "ferocious demand for total artistic commitment", while David Allan recalls that Tetley "fired up your imagination and made you look at yourself differently". Among the members of his chamber company was Christopher Bruce, the lead in his signature work, Pierrot Lunaire who cites Tetley as one of his inspirations.

Works

 1977: ballet "Mythical Hunters"

References

External links
The New York Times obituary for Tetley
The Guardian obituary for Tetley

1926 births
2007 deaths
American choreographers
American male ballet dancers
American expatriates in Canada
American expatriates in the United Kingdom
Franklin & Marshall College alumni
Artists from Cleveland
Artists from New York City
Deaths from skin cancer
Deaths from cancer in Florida
Modern dancers
Stuttgart Ballet
20th-century American ballet dancers